Jim Brown (born 1936) is a former American football player and actor.

Jim Brown may also refer to:

Arts and entertainment
Jim Ed Brown (1934–2015), American country music singer
Jim Brown (director) (born 1950), American film director
Jim Brown (radio host), Canadian radio host

Politics
Jim Brown (New South Wales politician) (1918–1999), Australian politician
Jim N. Brown (1926–1991), Michigan politician
Jim Brown (Western Australian politician) (1927–2020), Australian politician
Jim Brown (Ontario politician) (1943–2020), Canadian politician

Sports

Association football
Jim Brown (Cowdenbeath footballer) (died 1955), Scottish footballer
Jim Brown (soccer, born 1908) (1908–1994), Scottish-American soccer player
Jim Brown (footballer, born 1939) (1939–2015), Scottish footballer (Dumbarton, Darlington)
Jim Brown (footballer, born 1950), Scottish footballer (Hearts, Hibernian)
Jim Brown (footballer, born 1952), Scottish footballer (Sheffield United)

Baseball
Jim Brown (pitcher) (1860–1908), American baseball player
Jim Brown (catcher) (1892–1943), American Negro league baseball player
Jim Brown (outfielder) (1897–1944), American baseball outfielder

Other sports
Jim Brown (sprinter) (1909–2000), Canadian athlete
Jim Brown (basketball) (1912–1991), American professional basketball player
Jim J. Brown (1925–1995), Australian rules footballer for Geelong
Jim W. Brown (1926–2014), Australian rules footballer for Fitzroy
Jim Brown (ice hockey) (born 1960), American ice hockey player
Jim Brown (darts player) (born 1971), Scottish darts player

Others
Jim Brown (computer scientist) (born 1943), American computer scientist with IBM
Jim Brown (interpreter) (born 1953), American translator 
Thiruchelvam Nihal Jim Brown (1972–2006), Sri Lankan parish priest who disappeared during the Sri Lankan Civil War
Jim Brown (banker), New Zealand banker
Jim Brown (game designer), American video game designer with Epic Games
Jim Brown (multihull designer), multihull sailboat designer

Other uses
Jim Brown: All-American, 2002 documentary film about the American football player
Jim Brown Award (disambiguation), football awards named after the American football player
Jim Brown House, historical place in Peninsula, Ohio
Jim Brown Shield, Australian ice hockey award named after a Scottish-born Australian ice hockey player

See also
James Brown (disambiguation)